The Philippine House Committee on Cooperatives Development, or House Cooperatives Development Committee is a standing committee of the Philippine House of Representatives.

Jurisdiction 
As prescribed by House Rules, the committee's jurisdiction includes the following:
 Cooperatives inclusive of cooperative movements and organizations
 Electric cooperatives registered with the Cooperative Development Authority
 Implementation or amendment of the Cooperative Code of the Philippines
 Urban and rural-based credit, consumer, producers, marketing, service and multi-purpose cooperatives

Members, 18th Congress

Historical members

18th Congress

Chairperson 
 Sabiniano Canama (COOP-NATCCO) September 17, 2019 – December 14, 2020

See also 
 House of Representatives of the Philippines
 List of Philippine House of Representatives committees

References

External links 
House of Representatives of the Philippines

Cooperatives Development